Linguistic landscape is the "visibility and salience of languages on public and commercial signs in a given territory or region". Linguistic landscape has been described as being "somewhere at the junction of sociolinguistics, sociology, social psychology, geography, and media studies".
It is a concept which originated in sociolinguistics and language policy as scholars studied how languages are visually displayed and hierarchised in multilingual societies, from large metropolitan centers to Amazonia. For example, linguistic landscape scholars have described how and why some public signs in Jerusalem are presented in Hebrew, English, and Arabic, or a combination thereof.

Development of the field of study

Studies of the linguistic landscape have been published from research done around the world. The field of study is relatively recent; "the linguistic landscapes paradigm has evolved rapidly and while it has a number of key names associated with it, it currently has no clear orthodoxy or theoretical core". A special issue of the International Journal of Multilingualism (3.1 in 2006) was devoted to the subject.  Also, the journal World Englishes published a themed issue of five papers as a "Symposium on World Englishes and Linguistic Landscapes: Five Perspectives" (2012, vol. 31.1). Similarly, an entire issue of the International Journal of the Sociology of Language (228 in 2014) was devoted to the subject, including looking at signs that show influences from one language on another language. In 2015 an academic journal devoted to this topic was launched, titled Linguistic Landscape: An International Journal, from John Benjamins.  There is also a series of academic conferences on the study of linguistic landscape. A comprehensive, searchable Linguistic Landscape Bibliography is available. A 2016 special issue of Manusya (number 22, 2016) begins with a history and summary of the field.

Because "the methodologies employed in the collection and categorisation of written signs is still controversial", basic research questions are still being discussed, such as: "do small, hand-made signs count as much as large, commercially made signs?". The original technical scope of "linguistic landscape" involved plural languages, and almost all writers use it in that sense, but the scholar Papen has applied the term to the way public writing is used in a monolingual way in a German city and Heyd has applied the term to the ways that English is written, and people's reactions to these ways.

Multilingualism and monolingualism in signs 
In much of the research the signs studied are multilingual signs, reflecting an expected multilingual readership. In other cases, there are monolingual signs in different languages, written in relevant languages found within a multilingual community. Backhaus even points out that some signs are not meant to be understood so much as to appeal to readers via a more prestigious language (2007:58).Some signs are spelled to convey the aura of another language (sometimes genuinely spelled as in the other language, other times fictionally), but are still meant to be understood by monolinguals. For example, some signs in English are spelled in a way that conveys the aura of German or French, but are still meant to be understood by monolingual English speakers. Similarly, some signs use Latin script that is aestheticized to look like Chinese characters or Cyrillic script, in order to evoke the associated languages while still being readable to people who don't know them. For example, Leeman and Modan (2010) describe the use of aestheticized Latin script in the Washington DC's Chinatown and the Arab Quarter of Granada, Spain.

The study of linguistic landscape also examines such patterns as which languages are used for which types of institutions (e.g. country club, hospital, ethnic grocery store), which languages are used for more expensive/cheaper items (new cars or used cars), or which languages are used for more expensive/cheaper services (e.g. pool cleaning or washing machine repair). Also, the linguistic landscape can be studied across an area, to see which neighborhoods have signs in which languages. For example, Carr (2017) examined the languages of three cities in Southeast Los Angeles in her dissertation.

The languages used in public signs indicate what languages are locally relevant, or give evidence of what languages are becoming locally relevant (Hult 2009; Kasanga 2012). In many multilingual countries, multilingual signs and packaging are taken for granted, especially as merchants try to attract as many customers as possible or people realize that they serve a multilingual community (Hult, 2014). In other places, it is a matter of law, as in Quebec, where signs cannot be in English only, but must include French (Bill 101, Charte de la langue française). In Texas, some signs are required to be in English and Spanish, such as warning signs about consuming alcohol while pregnant. Linguistic landscape can also be applied to the study of competing scripts for a single language. For example, after the breakup of the Soviet Union, some signs in Mongolia were erected in the traditional Mongolian script, not just Cyrillic (Grivelet 2001). Similarly, in some Cherokee speaking communities, street signs and other public signage is written with the Cherokee syllabary (Bender 2008). Also, license plates in Greek Cyprus have been printed with Greek or Roman letters in different eras.

Different approaches to linguistic landscape studies 
More recently, scholars have rejected the purely quantitative approaches to Linguistic Landscape. For example, using Scollon and Scollon's (2003) framework of geosemiotics, researchers have analyzed the placement and relative size of different languages and signs. Leeman and Modan (2009) proposed a "contextualized historical approach" to linguistic landscape that emphasizes the importance of considering how the signs came to be, and what they mean in a given context. Their example of the different symbolic meanings of Chinese and English on Starbucks signs in Washington DC's Chinatown and a Shanghai shopping mall shows that it is unwise to draw conclusions based on the relative frequency of languages in signage.

The study of the linguistic landscape can also show evidence of the presence and roles of different languages through history. Some early work on a specific form of linguistic landscape was done in cemeteries used by immigrant communities, some languages being carved "long after the language ceased to be spoken" in the communities.

In addition to larger public signage, some who study linguistic landscapes are now including the study of other public objects with multilingual texts, such as banknotes in India which are labeled in over a dozen languages.

Linguistic landscape studies on areas of conflict 
The study of language in post-war and conflict-ridden areas has also attracted the interest of scholars who applied the Linguistic Landscape approach as a method to explore how language use in the public space represents ethnic groups, reflects territorial conflicts, expresses statehood and projects ideologies and socio-cultural identities. Themistocleous (2019) for instance explored the use of Greek and Turkish on public signs in the centre of Nicosia (Cyprus) and found that traditional discourses of separation and conflict are dominant in the public space but at the same time new discourses of unification, peace and integration slowly begin to surface.

Linguistic landscape in the Valencian community 

Valencia is an officially bilingual city, where Valencian and Spanish populations coexist. In this territory the Valencian language lives in a situation of diglossia, and therefore the Valencian public institutions must maintain, protect and promote the use of the Valencian language. To ensure this, in 2005 the Valencia City Council developed "the Reglamento municipal sobre uso y normalización del valenciano en el municipio de Valencia" ("Municipal Regulations on the Use and Standardisation of Valencian Language in the Municipality of Valencia"). The autonomous legislation of Valencia considers the use of Valencian as the preferred language for signs, banners, announcements, billboards, public road signs and toponyms. Moreover, the autonomous government and the municipal regulations from Valencia encourage private entities to use Valencian over Spanish in their efforts to raise the prestige and recognition of the language, which, despite being official, is used by minority throughout the territory.

Socially speaking, the Valencian Community is a territory with a great number of inhabitants who are either monolingual in Spanish, or bilingual in Spanish-Valencian, and it is a strongly touristy region. There is international tourism, especially from England and Northern Europe, and also national tourism. Among the use of other languages within the territory, the use of English is noteworthy as a lingua franca or vehicular language. For this reason, many shops use English in order to be accessible to a wider public. As described by Bruyèl-Olmedo and Juan-Garau, "among the number of languages featured on signs, shop fronts, billboards and the like, English enjoys a privileged position when it comes to addressing a multilingual, heterogeneous readership"

Basque and Spanish languages 
The Basque Country has invested in the protection of bilingualism, with particular regard to the introduction of measures aimed at ensuring the normalisation of the Basque language in institutions and the achievement of equal rights in its use and enjoyment for citizens, which at the moment is not fully achieved, especially in the working environment. In fact, according to the Unesco Atlas of the World's Languages in Danger, Basque is a minority and vulnerable language in its own territory, and is in an asymmetrical situation with respect to the other official language, Spanish. The challenge, therefore, is to bring the two official languages (Castilian and Euskara) up to the same level in practice, beyond the formal recognition they have already enjoyed since 1978, the year in which the newborn Constitution established in the second paragraph of Article 3 that all other languages should be equally official in their respective Autonomous Communities.This historic concession constituted a decisive change of direction after the years of Franco's dictatorship, during which the regime had banned the use of the Basque language and attempted to erase its history and traditions.

The Statute of Autonomy of the Basque Country (1979), for its part, proclaimed the status of the Basque language as its own official language in the Autonomous Community of the Basque Country and the right of all persons to know and use both official languages (Article 6.1). Finally, Article 6.4 provided that the Royal Academy of the Basque Language-Euskaltzaindia is the official consultative institution with regard to Basque.

Getting to the present day, in 2009 of the approximately two million people living in the Autonomous Community of the Basque Country, or Euskadi, only around 35% spoke Euskera, the Basque language, a non-Indo-European language isolate. Apart from that, notably Euskera had also a 9% of speakers in the Autonomous Community of Navarre and 26% in the Basque territories in the south of France.

At the time, it was in the second year of the Basque Government's fourth planning period (2008-2012). Since then, the major intervention made is that contained in Decree 179/2019 of 19 November 2019, which gave to each local council the decision-making power on how to organise the use of both languages in its internal and public relations.

This decree put an end to the stage of a single rule for all local entities, and opened a new time in which each local institution could decide which language to use according to its sociolinguistic reality.

Among its objectives: to make Basque the language of work and of relations between administrations, to rationalise the use of translations and interpretations and to promote the use of the language in and from municipalities.

Examples

Notes

References

Ben Said, Selim. 2010. Urban Street Signs in the Linguistic Landscape of Tunisia: Tensions in Policy, Representation, and Attitudes. Doctoral dissertation, Pennsylvania State University.

Gorter, Durk, Heiko F. Marten and Luk Van Mensel, eds. 2012. Minority Languages in the Linguistic Landscape. (Palgrave Studies in Minority Languages and Communities.) Basingstoke, England: Palgrave Macmillan.

 Gubitosi, Patricia and Michelle F. Ramos Pellicia, eds. 2021. Linguistic Landscape in the Spanish-speaking World. John Benjamins.

 Hult, F.M. (2014). Drive-thru linguistic landscaping: Constructing a linguistically dominant place in a bilingual space. International Journal of Bilingualism, 18, 507-523.
 Hult, F.M. (2009). Language ecology and linguistic landscape analysis. In E. Shohamy & D. Gorter (Eds.), Linguistic landscape: Expanding the scenery (pp. 88–104). London: Routledge.

Leeman, Jennifer; Modan, Gabriella (2009). Commodified language in Chinatown: A contextualized approach to linguistic landscape. The Journal of Sociolinguistics 13(3), 333-363. 
Leeman, Jennifer; Modan, Gabriella (2010). Selling the City: Language, ethnicity and commodified space. In Elana Shohamy, Eli Ben-Rafael and Monica Barni (Eds.) Linguistic Landscape in the City. Clevedon: Multilingual Matters. 182-197.

Pons Rodríguez, Lola. 2012. El paisaje lingüístico de Sevilla. Lenguas y variedades en el escenario urbano hispalense. Sevilla: Diputación Provincial de Sevilla, Colección Archivo Hispalense. (Download)
Rasinger, Sebastian M. (2014): Linguistic landscapes in Southern Carinthia (Austria), Journal of Multilingual and Multicultural Development,

External links
Linguistic Landscape Bibliography
Linguistic Landscape: An International Journal

Multilingualism
Sociolinguistics
Multilingual texts